Universität Essen (Essen University) is an underground station of the Essen Stadtbahn in the Stadtkern district, Essen. Today, lines U11 and U17 call the station. It is located at the crossroads of Grillostraße/Hans-Böckler-Straße and Segerothstraße/Bottroper Straße. The station has two tracks. There is no lift in operation.

The station opened on 27 November 1981, when the line U18 was extended and the U17 was built from Hirschlandplatz to here.

The University of Duisburg-Essen is close to the station.

References 

Railway stations in Essen